Prof. K.H. Abdel Kahar Moezakir or new spelling Abdul Kahar Muzakir (16 April 1907 – 2 December 1973), was chosen Rector Magnificus Islamic University of Indonesia for the first time with the name of STI during two periods – 1945–48 and 1948–60 – he was a member of the  Investigating Committee for Preparatory Work for Independence (BPUPK).

References

External links
 Profile on the official website of Islamic University of Indonesia.

1907 births
1973 deaths
BPUPK